Fountain or syke is in the terminology of heraldry a roundel depicted as a roundel barry wavy argent and azure, that is, containing alternating horizontal wavy bands of silver (or white) and blue.  Traditionally, there are six bands: three of each tincture.

Because the fountain consists equally of parts in a metal and a colour, its use is not limited by the rule of tincture as are the other roundels. The fountain may be made in any heraldic tinctures, but unless otherwise stated, it is silver/white and blue.

If the blazon of a coat of arms contains the word fountain, it is not a natural, water-gushing fountain which should be depicted but a roundel like this.

Examples

References

Heraldic charges
Fountains
Visual motifs